is a monorail station operated by the Tokyo Tama Intercity Monorail Company in Higashiyamato, Tokyo, Japan.

Lines
Sakurakaidō Station is a station on the Tama Toshi Monorail Line and is located 0.7 kilometers from the terminus of the line at Kamikitadai Station.

Station layout
Sakurakaidō Station is a raised station with two tracks and two side platforms. It has a standardized station building of the monorail line.

Platforms

Surrounding area
The station is above Tokyo Metropolitan Route 43 (Imokubo-Kaidō). Other points of interest include:
 Morinaga Milk Industry, Tokyo Tama Plant / Yamato Plant
 Casio Hitachi Mobile Communications, Tokyo Plant
 Sakura Kaidō

History
The station opened on 27 November 1998 with the opening of the line.

Station numbering was introduced in February 2018 with Sakurakaidō being assigned TT18.

References

External links

 Tama Monorail Sakura-Kaidō Station 

Railway stations in Japan opened in 1998
Railway stations in Tokyo
Tama Toshi Monorail
Higashiyamato, Tokyo